"Advance Australia Fair" is the national anthem of Australia. Written by Scottish-born composer Peter Dodds McCormick, the song was first performed as a patriotic song in Australia in 1878. It replaced "God Save the Queen" as the official national anthem in 1974, following a nationwide opinion survey, only for "God Save the Queen" to be reinstated in January 1976. However, a plebiscite to choose the national song in 1977 preferred "Advance Australia Fair", which was in turn reinstated as the national anthem in 1984. "God Save the King/Queen" became known as the royal anthem, and is used at public engagements attended by the King or members of the British royal family. The lyrics of the 1984 version of "Advance Australia Fair" were modified from McCormick's original and its verses were trimmed down from four to two. In January 2021, the lyrics were changed once again.

History

Origin

"Advance Australia Fair" was published in early December 1878 by Scottish-born composer Peter Dodds McCormick (1833–1916) under the pen-name "Amicus" (which means "friend" in Latin). It was first sung by Andrew Fairfax, accompanied by a concert band conducted by McCormick, at a function of the Highland Society of New South Wales in Sydney on 30 November 1878 (Saint Andrew's Day). The song gained in popularity and an amended version was sung by a choir of around 10,000 at the inauguration of the Commonwealth of Australia on 1 January 1901. In 1907 the Australian Government awarded McCormick £100 for his composition.

In a letter to R.B. Fuller dated 1 August 1913, McCormick described the circumstances that inspired him to write "Advance Australia Fair":

The earliest known sound recording of "Advance Australia Fair" appears in The Landing of the Australian Troops in Egypt (circa 1916), a short commercial recording dramatising the arrival of Australian troops in Egypt en route to Gallipoli.

Before its adoption as Australia's national anthem, "Advance Australia Fair" had considerable use elsewhere. For example, Australia's national broadcaster, the Australian Broadcasting Commission, used it to announce its news bulletins until 1952. It was also frequently played at the start or end of official functions. Towards the end of World War II it was one of three songs played in certain picture theatres, along with "God Save the King" and the US national anthem.

Influence
Other songs and marches have been influenced by "Advance Australia Fair", such as the Australian vice-regal salute.

Competitions, plebiscite and adoption

In 1973, Prime Minister Gough Whitlam and his government, desiring to forge a new nationalism separate from the United Kingdom, decided that Australia needed a national anthem that could represent the country with "distinction", and they held a competition to find one to replace the existing anthem, "God Save the Queen". In January of that year, Whitlam dedicated an entire Australia Day speech to the search for a new anthem, referring to it as a "symbolic expression of our national pride and dignity". The Australia Council for the Arts organised the contest, which was dubbed the "Australian National Anthem Quest". The contest was held in two stages, the first seeking lyrics and the second music, each having a large prize of A$5,000 for the winning entry. On the recommendation of the Council for the Arts, none of the new entries was felt worthy enough, so the contest ended with suggestions for "Advance Australia Fair", "Waltzing Matilda" and "The Song of Australia".

In 1974 the Whitlam government performed a nationwide opinion survey to determine the song to be sung on occasions of national significance. Conducted through the Australian Bureau of Statistics, the survey polled 60,000 people nationally. "Advance Australia Fair" was chosen by 51.4% of respondents and, on 9 April of that year, Whitlam announced in parliament that it was the national anthem. It was to be used on all occasions excepting those of a specifically regal nature. A spokesman for Whitlam later stated that the Government regarded the tune, primarily, as the national anthem. During the 1975 election campaign following the dismissal of Whitlam by Sir John Kerr, David Combe proposed that the song be played at the start of the Labor Party's official campaign launch on 24 November 1975 at Festival Hall, Melbourne. Whitlam's speechwriter Graham Freudenberg rejected this idea because, among other reasons, the status of the anthem at that point was still tentative.

On 22 January 1976 the Fraser government reinstated "God Save the Queen" as the national anthem for use at royal, vice-regal, defence and loyal toast occasions. Fraser stated that "Advance Australia Fair", "Song of Australia" or "Waltzing Matilda" could be used for non-regal occasions. His government made plans to conduct a national poll to find a song for use on ceremonial occasions when it was desired to mark a separate Australian identity. This was conducted as a plebiscite to choose the National Song, held as an optional additional question in the 1977 referendum on various issues. On 23 May the government announced the results, "Advance Australia Fair" received 43.29% of the vote, defeating the three alternatives, "Waltzing Matilda" (28.28%), "The Song of Australia" (9.65%) and the existing national anthem, "God Save the Queen" (18.78%).

"Advance Australia Fair", with modified lyrics and reduced to two verses (see development of lyrics), was adopted as the Australian national anthem by the Labor government of Bob Hawke, coming into effect on 19 April 1984. At the same time, "God Save the King/Queen" became known as the royal anthem, and continues to be played alongside the Australian national anthem at public engagements in Australia that are attended by the King or members of the Royal Family.

Even though any personal copyright of Peter Dodds McCormick's original lyrics has expired, as he died in 1916, the Commonwealth of Australia claims copyright on the official lyrics and particular arrangements of music. Non-commercial use of the anthem is permitted without case-by-case permission, but the Commonwealth government requires permission for commercial use.

The orchestral arrangement of "Advance Australia Fair" that is now regularly played for Australian victories at international sporting medal ceremonies, and at the openings of major domestic sporting, cultural and community events, is by Tommy Tycho, an immigrant from Hungary. It was commissioned by ABC Music in 1984 and then televised by Channel 10 in 1986 in their Australia Day broadcast, featuring Julie Anthony as the soloist.

Legislative basis 
The national anthem was changed on 1 January 2021 by proclamation of the Governor-General on the advice of the Federal Executive Council. The change prior to that was on 19 April 1984.

Lyrics
The lyrics of "Advance Australia Fair", as modified by the National Australia Day Council, were officially adopted in April 1984. The lyrics were updated as of 1 January 2021 in an attempt to recognise the legacy of Indigenous Australians, with the word "one" in the second line replacing the previous "young". The lyrics are now as follows:

I
Australians all let us rejoice,
For we are one and free;
We’ve golden soil and wealth for toil,
Our home is girt by sea;
Our land abounds in Nature’s gifts
Of beauty rich and rare;
In history’s page, let every stage
Advance Australia fair!
In joyful strains then let us sing,
Advance Australia fair!
II
Beneath our radiant Southern Cross,
We’ll toil with hearts and hands;
To make this Commonwealth of ours
Renowned of all the lands;
For those who’ve come across the seas
We’ve boundless plains to share;
With courage let us all combine
To advance Australia fair.
In joyful strains then let us sing
Advance Australia fair!

Development of lyrics
Since the original lyrics were written in 1878, there have been several changes, in some cases with the intent of altering the anthem's political focus especially in regard to gender neutrality and Indigenous Australians. Some of these have been minor while others have significantly altered the song. The original song was four verses long. For its 1984 adoption as the national anthem, the song was cut from the four verses to two. The first verse was kept largely as the 1878 original, except for the change in the first line from " let us rejoice" to " let us rejoice". The second, third and fourth verses of the original were dropped, in favour of a modified version of the new third verse which was sung at Federation in 1901.

The lyrics published in the second edition (1879) were as follows:

I
Australia's sons, let us rejoice,
For we are young and free;
We've golden soil and wealth for toil,
Our home is girt by sea;
Our land abounds in nature's gifts
Of beauty rich and rare;
In history's page, let every stage
Advance Australia fair.
In joyful strains let us sing,
Advance, Australia fair.
II
When gallant Cook from Albion sail'd,
To trace wide oceans o'er,
True British courage bore him on,
Til he landed on our shore.
Then here he raised Old England's flag,
The standard of the brave;
"With all her faults we love her still"
"Britannia rules the wave."
In joyful strains then let us sing,
Advance, Australia fair.
III
While other nations of the globe
Behold us from afar,
We'll rise to high renown and shine
Like our glorious southern star;
From England soil and Fatherland,
Scotia and Erin fair,
Let all combine with heart and hand
To advance Australia fair.
In joyful strains then let us sing
Advance, Australia fair.
IV
Should foreign foe e'er sight our coast,
Or dare a foot to land,
We'll rouse to arms like sires of yore,
To guard our native strand;
Britannia then shall surely know,
Though oceans roll between,
Her sons in fair Australia's land
Still keep their courage green.
In joyful strains then let us sing
Advance Australia fair.

The 1901 Federation version of the third verse was originally sung as:

III
Beneath our radiant Southern Cross,
We'll toil with hearts and hands;
To make our youthful Commonwealth,
Renowned of all the lands;
For loyal sons beyond the seas
We've boundless plains to share;
With courage let us all combine
To advance Australia fair.
In joyful strains then let us sing
Advance Australia fair!

The lyrics of "Advance Australia Fair", as modified by the National Australia Day Council and officially adopted on 19 April 1984, were as follows:

I
Australians all let us rejoice,
For we are young and free;
We've golden soil and wealth for toil;
Our home is girt by sea;
Our land abounds in nature's gifts
Of beauty rich and rare;
In history's page, let every stage
Advance Australia Fair.
In joyful strains then let us sing,
Advance Australia Fair.
II
Beneath our radiant Southern Cross
We'll toil with hearts and hands;
To make this Commonwealth of ours
Renowned of all the lands;
For those who've come across the seas
We've boundless plains to share;
With courage let us all combine
To Advance Australia Fair.
In joyful strains then let us sing,
Advance Australia Fair.

These lyrics were updated on 1 January 2021 to the current version, in which "young" in the second line is replaced with "one" to reflect the pre-colonial presence of Indigenous Australians.

Criticism

General criticism
In May 1976, after reinstating "God Save the Queen", Fraser advised the Australian Olympic Federation to use "Waltzing Matilda" as the national anthem for the forthcoming Montreal Olympic Games. Fraser responded to criticism of "Waltzing Matilda" compared with "Advance Australia Fair", and countered, "in the second verse... we find these words, 'Britannia rules the waves'." Despite the outcome of the 1977 plebiscite to choose the National Song favouring "Advance Australia Fair", successive Fraser Ministries did not implement the change.

The fourth line of the anthem, "our home is girt by sea", has been criticised for using the so-called archaic word "girt". Additionally, the lyrics and melody of the Australian national anthem have been criticised in some quarters as being dull and unendearing to the Australian people. National Party senator Sandy Macdonald said in 2001 that "'Advance Australia Fair' is so boring that the nation risks singing itself to sleep, with boring music and words impossible to understand".

Political sentiment is divided. Craig Emerson of the Australian Labor Party has critiqued the anthem, former MP Peter Slipper has said that Australia should consider another anthem, in 2011 former Victorian Premier Jeff Kennett suggested "I Am Australian", while former Australian Labor Party leader Kim Beazley defended it.

Recognition of Indigenous Australians
The song has been criticised for failing to represent or acknowledge Australia's Indigenous peoples and aspects of the country's colonial past. The lyrics have been accused of celebrating British colonisation and perpetuating the concept of terra nullius, with the second line of the anthem ("for we are young and free") criticised in particular for ignoring the long history of Indigenous Australians. It has also been suggested that the word "fair" celebrates the "civilising" mission of British colonists.

Since about 2015, public debate about the anthem has increased.  Boxer Anthony Mundine stated in 2013, 2017 and 2018 that he would not stand for the anthem, prompting organisers not to play it before his fights. In September 2018 a 9-year-old Brisbane girl was disciplined by her school after refusing to stand for the national anthem; her actions were applauded by some public commenters, and criticised by others. In 2019, several National Rugby League football players decided not to sing the anthem before the first match of the State of Origin series and before the Indigenous All-Stars series with New Zealand; NRL coach and celebrated former player Mal Meninga supported the protesting players and called for a referendum on the subject.

Several alternative versions of "Advance Australia Fair" have been proposed to address the alleged exclusion of Indigenous Australians. Judith Durham of The Seekers and Mutti Mutti musician Kutcha Edwards released their alternative lyrics in 2009, replacing "for we are young and free" with the opening lines "Australians let us stand as one, upon this sacred land". In 2015, Aboriginal Australian soprano Deborah Cheetham declined an invitation to sing the anthem at the 2015 AFL grand final after the AFL turned down her request to replace the words "for we are young and free" with "in peace and harmony". She has advocated for the lyrics being rewritten and endorsed Durham and Edwards' alternative version.

In 2017 the Recognition in Anthem Project was established and began work on a new version, with lyrics written by poet and former Victorian Supreme Court judge Peter Vickery following consultation with Indigenous communities and others. Vickery's proposed lyrics replaced "we are young and free" with "we are one and free" in the first verse, deleted the second and added two new ones; the second verse acknowledging Indigenous history, immigration and calls for unity and respect, and the third adapting lines from the official second verse. It was debuted at the Desert Song Festival in Alice Springs by an Aboriginal choir. Former prime minister Bob Hawke endorsed Vickery's alternative lyrics in 2018. In 2017, the federal government under then prime minister Malcolm Turnbull granted permission for Vickery's lyrics to be sung at certain occasions as a "patriotic song", but said that before making any official change to the anthem, "The Government would need to be convinced of a sufficient groundswell of support in the wider community".

In November 2020, NSW Premier Gladys Berejiklian proposed changing one word in the opening couplet, from "we are young and free" to "we are one and free", to acknowledge Australia's Indigenous history. The proposal was supported by the federal Minister for Indigenous Australians, Ken Wyatt, and in December 2020 Prime Minister Scott Morrison announced that this change would be adopted from 1 January 2021, having received approval from Governor-General David Hurley.

Dharawal lyrics
Lyrics for the anthem have been written twice in the Dharug language, an Australian Aboriginal language spoken around Sydney by the Dharawal people.

A first version was first performed in July 2010, at a Rugby League State of Origin match in Sydney, though there was some opposition:

In December 2020, another setting, in Dharug, followed by the anthem in English, was sung before a Rugby Union international between Australia and Argentina:

Other unofficial variants
In 2011, about fifty different Christian schools from different denominations came under criticism for singing an unofficial version of the song written by the Sri Lankan immigrant Ruth Ponniah in 1988. The song replaced the official second verse of "Advance Australia Fair" with lyrics that were Christian in nature.

Minister for School Education, Early Childhood and Youth Peter Garrett and chief executive of the National Australia Day Council Warren Pearson admonished the schools for modifying the lyrics of the anthem, and the Australian Parents Council and the Federation of Parents and Citizens' Association of NSW called for a ban on the modified song. Stephen O'Doherty, chief executive of Christian Schools Australia, defended the use of the lyrics in response.

References

Notes

External links

 Lyrics on official government website
 Streaming audio of Advance Australia Fair with links and information (archive link)
 Brief history
 Australian Government websites:
 Official published lyrics, music with band parts and sound recordings
 Four-part musical score & lyrics PDF 169 KB 
 Australian National Anthem Audio  for download (MP3 2.04 MB) 
 Department of Foreign Affair and Trade's webpage on Advance Australia Fair
 Online scores held by Australian government libraries (The MusicAustralia collaboration)
 Advance Australia Fair (Original Lyrics) – Australian singer Peter Dawson (c. 1930)
 
 
 
 
 MIDI version

Oceanian anthems
National symbols of Australia
Australian patriotic songs
1878 songs
National anthems
National anthem compositions in C major